The Bukit Jalil Sports School (BJSS) (SSBJ) is the first sports school in Malaysia. The school is located at the National Sports Complex compound in Bukit Jalil, Kuala Lumpur.

Sekolah Sukan Bukit Jalil was opened in 1996 and the pioneers were only Form One and Form Four students.

Ex-sprinter and former Sportswoman of the Years Marina Chin became head teacher in 2007.

Notable alumni

Diving
Bryan Nickson Lomas, diver
Cheong Jun Hoong, diver
Pandelela Rinong, diver
Nur Dhabitah Sabri, diver

Football
Mohd Asraruddin Putra Omar, footballer
Mohd Shakir Shaari, footballer Johor Darul Takzim
Nazmi Faiz, footballer Johor Darul Takzim 
Wan Zack Haikal Wan Noor, footballer Selangor
Khairul Fahmi Che Mat, goalkeeper Melaka United

Badminton
Aaron Chia, badminton player 
Goh Liu Ying, badminton player
Junaidi Arif, badminton player 
Lee Zii Jia, badminton player
Leong Jun Hao, badminton player
Man Wei Chong, badminton player
Muhammad Haikal, badminton player
Soh Wooi Yik, badminton player
Tee Kai Wun, badminton player
Loh Le Quan, badminton player

Tennis
Syed Mohd Agil Syed Naguib, tennis player

Gymnastics
Loo Phay Xing, gymnast 
Farah Ann Abdul Hadi, gymnast

Cycling
Azizulhasni Awang, track cyclist
Muhammad Shah Firdaus Sahrom, track cyclist

Swimming
Welson Sim, swimmer
Phee Jinq En, swimmer

Track and Field
Lee Hup Wei, high jumper
Muhammad Hakimi Ismail, triple jumper
Nauraj Singh Randhawa, high jumper 
Muhammad Irfan Shamshuddin, discus thrower
Abdul Latif Romly, long jumper
Khairul Hafiz Jantan, sprinter

Weightlifting
Azroy Hazalwafie, weightlifter 
Aznil Bidin, weightlifter 
Mohamad Fazrul Azrie Mohdad, weightlifter 
Mohamad Aniq Kasdan, weightlifter

Notable personnel
 Head Coach: Reduan Abdullah

See also
 Harimau Muda A
 Harimau Muda B
 Harimau Muda C
 Malaysia Pahang Sports School
 National Football Development Programme of Malaysia

References

External links
 BJSS website

Sport schools in Malaysia
Boarding schools in Malaysia
Sport in Kuala Lumpur
Football clubs in Malaysia
Educational institutions established in 1996
1996 establishments in Malaysia
Football academies in Malaysia
Secondary schools in Malaysia
Publicly funded schools in Malaysia
Badminton in Malaysia